The  is a commuter railway line in Hyōgo Prefecture, Japan operated by Kobe Electric Railway. It connects Kobe with its northern suburb, Sanda.

History
The entire line opened in 1928,  gauge and electrified at 1500 VDC.

In 1991 the Sanda - Yokoyama section was duplicated, as was the Taoji - Okaba section in 1998. 

In November 1995, Special Rapid Express services were introduced to the timetable.

In March 2011, the smoking areas in all Sanda Line stations were removed, and smoking was banned.

Former connecting lines
Sanda station - The 12 km line to Arima operated from 1915 to 1943.

Stations
There are four types of services, each stops at the stations marked "S" and not at those marked "↑" in the table below.

References
This article incorporates material from the corresponding article in the Japanese Wikipedia

External links
神戸電鉄／鉄道のご案内 (Shintetsu Railway Information)

Transport in Kobe
Railway lines in Japan
Railway lines opened in 1928